Dirceu (1952-1995), Dirceu José Guimarães, was a Brazilian football attacking midfielder.

Dirceu may also refer to:

Given name
 Dirceu (footballer, born 1942), Dirceu Ferreira, Brazilian football forward
 Dirceu Krüger (1945-2019), Brazilian football midfielder
 Dirceu Lopes (born 1946), Brazilian football attacking midfielder
 Dirceu Vegini (1952-2018), Brazilian Roman Catholic bishop
 Dirceu Marinho (born 1970), Brazilian rower
 Dirceu Pinto (1980-2020), Brazilian Paralympic boccia player
 Dirceu Cabarca (born 1985), Panamanian boxer
 Dirceu (footballer, born 1988), Dirceu Wiggers de Oliveira Filho, Brazilian football centre-back
 Dirceu (footballer, born 1989), Dirceu Inácio da Silva Júnior, Brazilian football defender

Surname
 José Dirceu (born 1946), Brazilian politician
 Xavier Dirceu (born 1977), Brazilian football defensive midfielder

Other uses
 Dirceu Arcoverde, municipality in Piauí, Brazil
 Marília de Dirceu, Brazilian poetry book